Sébastien Pauvert (born September 27, 1977, in Beaupréau) is a French professional football player. Currently, he plays in the Championnat de France amateur for Vendée Fontenay Foot.

He played on the professional level in Ligue 2 for FC Istres.

1977 births
Living people
French footballers
Ligue 2 players
FC Istres players
SO Cholet players
US Quevilly-Rouen Métropole players
Vendée Fontenay Foot players
Association football goalkeepers